Heikki Simonen (22 April 1902 - 16 January 1975) was a Finnish smallholder and politician, born in Alavieska. He was a member of the Parliament of Finland from 1939 to 1951, representing the Social Democratic Party of Finland (SDP).

References

1902 births
1975 deaths
People from Alavieska
People from Oulu Province (Grand Duchy of Finland)
Social Democratic Party of Finland politicians
Members of the Parliament of Finland (1939–45)
Members of the Parliament of Finland (1945–48)
Members of the Parliament of Finland (1948–51)
Finnish people of World War II